1957–58 was the 12th season of the Western International Hockey League.

Standings 

 Spokane Flyers	        30-17-1-61	218-171
 Rossland Warriors	28-20-0-56	190-169
 Nelson Maple Leafs	20-27-1-41	184-211
 Trail Smoke Eaters	17-31-0-34	175-216

Playoffs

Semi finals 
Spokane vs. Trail (Best of 7).
Spokane Flyers beat Trail Smoke Eaters 4 wins to 3.
 Trail 4 Spokane 2
 Trail 7 Spokane 3
 Spokane 10 Trail 3
 Trail 5 Spokane 2
 Spokane 5 Trail 2
 Spokane 3 Trail 2
 Spokane 4 Trail 2

Nelson vs. Rossland (Best of 7).
Rossland Warriors beat Nelson Maple Leafs 4 wins to 1.

 Nelson 5 Rossland 3
 Rossland 5 Nelson 3
 Rossland 5 Nelson 1
 Rossland 3 Nelson 2
 Rossland 5 Nelson 2

Final 
Rossland vs. Spokane (Best of 7).
Rossland Warriors beat Spokane Flyers 4 wins to 2.
 Rossland 4 Spokane 3
 Spokane 6 Rossland 0
 Spokane 5 Rossland 0
 Rossland 3 Spokane 2
 Rossland 2 Spokane 1
 Rossland 4 Spokane 2

Rossland Warriors advanced to the 1957-58 British Columbia Senior Playoffs.

References 

 The Spokesman-Review - 13 May 1957
 The Spokesman-Review - 13 Sep 1957
 The Spokesman-Review - 25 Nov 1957
 Spokane Daily Chronicle - 27 Nov 1957
 Spokane Daily Chronicle - 6 Dec 1957
 The Spokesman-Review - 24 Dec 1957
 Spokane Daily Chronicle - 31 Dec 1957
 Spokane Daily Chronicle - 4 Jan 1958
 Spokane Daily Chronicle - 27 Feb 1958
 The Spokesman-Review - 11 Mar 1958
 The Spokesman-Review - 12 Mar 1958
 The Spokesman-Review - 14 Mar 1958

Western International Hockey League seasons
Wihl
Wihl